Vittorio Foa (18 September 1910 – 20 October 2008) was an Italian politician, trade unionist, journalist and writer.

Biography
Foa was born in Turin in 1910 into a middle-class Jewish family.

He attended Liceo Classico Massimo d'Azeglio in Turin for his sixth form/senior high school studies. In 1931, Foa graduated in Law from the University of Turin and worked in a bank. In 1933, he joined Giustizia e Libertà, an anti-fascist political movement. He was arrested by the OVRA in May 1935 and was condemned to 15 years in prison. He shared his cell with Ernesto Rossi, Massimo Mila and Riccardo Bauer.

Foa was released in August 1943. He joined the resistance movement and entered the Action Party (Partito d’Azione; PdA). As a PdA member, he was involved with the National Liberation Committee (Comitato di Liberazione Nazionale; CLN)

On 2 June 1946, Foa was elected a member of the Constituent Assembly and he also became a member of the Commission of the Seventy. Foa’s name was linked to articles 39 and 40 of the Constitution dealing with the freedom of trade union organisation.

When the PdA dissolved in 1947, Foa joined the Italian Socialist Party (Partito Socialista Italiano; PSI) and was elected an MP in 1953 (and again in 1958 and 1963). In 1957, he joined the left-wing trade union of Giuseppe Di Vittorio, the Italian General Confederation of Labour (Confederazione Generale Italiana del Lavoro; CGIL), and became an influential and highly charismatic trade union leader.

A leading intellectual of the Italian non-Communist left, Foa supported the theory of the political autonomy of the working class, which would later inspire the foundation of several extra-parliamentary leftist groups of which Foa was to become a member, including the PSIUP, PdUP and DP.

At the end of the 1970s, Foa left trade union and political life to devote himself to historical research and publishing. He taught Modern History at the Universities of Modena and Turin and researched the history of the working class and of the trade unions. Publications of this period include La Gerusalemme rimandata: Domande di oggi agli inglesi del primo Novecento (1985), a study of English working class movements at the beginning of the twentieth century.

In the late 1980s, Foa played an active part in the re-thinking of the Italian left and took a keen interest in the debates within the Italian Communist Party (Partito Comunista Italiano; PCI). In 1987 he was elected Senator from the PCI’s list of candidates.

In 1992 Foa retired, dividing his time between Rome and Formia. One of his last public appearances took place in 2002, when he joined the “Manifestazione dei Girotondi”, a spontaneous civil movement that developed between 2002 and 2003 in several Italian towns.

Defined as "the critical voice of the Italian left", Foa devoted his life to Italian and European politics in their widest sense, and constantly expressed his confidence in the young. From the role of the trade unions, to the place of science in our contemporary society, his interests embraced crucial aspects of modern life and society.

He died on 20 October 2008 in Formia.

On 21 October 2008, Italian newspapers were filled with tributes to Foa. In La Repubblica, the journalist Miriam Mafai recalled his impatience when asked what the beleaguered Italian left should do. "It’s a waste of time and sense to try to define a leftist identity" – Mafai recalled Foa saying – "You have to do what is right and necessary for the country. It is up to posterity to decide whether it came from the right or the left."

Selected bibliography
La cultura della CGIL. Scritti e interventi 1950-1970 (1984)
Riprendere tempo: Un diaologo con postilla (1982, with Pietro Marcenaro)
La Gerusalemme rimandata: Domande di oggi agli inglesi del primo Novecento (1985)
Il difficile cammino del lavoro (1990, with Vittorio Rieser)
Il Cavallo e la Torre: Riflessioni su una vita (1991)
Le virtù della Repubblica (1994, with Paul Ginsborg)
Del disordine e della libertà: Padre e figlio tra incertezze e speranze (1995, with Renzo Foa)
Il sogno di una Destra normale (1995, with Furio Colombo)
Questo Novecento (1996)
Lettere della giovinezza. Dal Carcere, 1935-1943 (1998, edited by Federica Montevecchi)
Lavori in corso, 1943-1946(1999, edited by Federica Montevecchi)
Il tempo del sapere (2000, with Andrea Ranieri)
Il ritorno dell'individuo: Cosa cambia nel lavoro e nella politica (2000, with Massimo Crosti)
Passaggi (2000); Sulle montagne (2002)
Il silenzio dei comunisti (2002, with Miriam Mafai and Alfredo Reichlin)
Un dialogo (2003, with Carlo Ginzburg)
La memoria è lunga (2003, with Federica Montevecchi)
Il linguaggio del tempo (2004, with Valter Casini)
Cent’anni dopo: Il sindacato dopo il sindacato (2006, with Gugliemo Epifani)
Le parole della politica (2008, with Federica Montevecchi)

References

External links

1910 births
2008 deaths
Politicians from Turin
20th-century Italian Jews
Action Party (Italy) politicians
Italian Socialist Party politicians
Proletarian Democracy politicians
Italian Communist Party politicians
Democratic Party of the Left politicians
Democrats of the Left politicians
Democratic Party (Italy) politicians
Members of the Constituent Assembly of Italy
Deputies of Legislature II of Italy
Deputies of Legislature III of Italy
Deputies of Legislature IV of Italy
Deputies of Legislature VII of Italy
Senators of Legislature X of Italy
Members of Giustizia e Libertà
Writers from Turin
Jewish socialists
Journalists from Turin
Italian male journalists
Italian male writers
20th-century Italian journalists
Il manifesto editors
Italian newspaper editors